The Haines Mountains are a range of ice-capped mountains trending northwest–southeast for about  and forming the southwest wall of Hammond Glacier, in the Ford Ranges of Marie Byrd Land, Antarctica. They were discovered by the Byrd Antarctic Expedition in 1934, and named for William C. Haines, the meteorologist of the Byrd expeditions of 1928–30 and 1933–35.

Features
 Alexander Peak
 Buennagel Peak

References

Ford Ranges